Basilides Mária (Hungarian) or Mária Basilides (11 November 1886 - 26 September 1946) was a Hungarian contralto singer.

She was born in Jelšava on 11 November 1886, and studied at the Budapest Academy of Music.She married music critic . 

She died in Budapest on 26 September 1946 and is buried in the Kerepesi Cemetery in Budapest.

References

Further reading
 

1886 births
1946 deaths
20th-century Hungarian women opera singers
Operatic contraltos